USS Carpellotti (DE-548) was a proposed World War II United States Navy John C. Butler-class destroyer escort that was never completed.

Plans called for Carpellotti to be built at the Boston Navy Yard in Boston, Massachusetts. The contract for her construction was cancelled in 1944 before she could be launched.

The name Carpellotti was reassigned to the destroyer escort USS Carpellotti (DE-720), which was converted during construction into the fast transport USS Carpellotti (APD-136).

References

Navsource Naval History: Photographic History of the U.S. Navy: Destroyer Escorts, Frigates, Littoral Warfare Vessels

John C. Butler-class destroyer escorts
Cancelled ships of the United States Navy